The Clemente Soto Vélez Cultural and Educational Center, often called The Clemente, is a Puerto Rican/Latinx cultural center named after Puerto Rican writer and activist, Clemente Soto Vélez. The Clemente, which was established as a cultural center in 1993, is located on 107 Suffolk Street in the former PS 160 in Manhattan's historic Lower East Side neighborhood (known as Loisaida by locals).

In addition to hosting programming related to Peforma and IDEAS City, the Center is also home to Teatro La Tea, LEFT (Latino Experimental Fantastic Theater), and the leading children’s company SEA, believed to be the only bilingual puppet theatre in the United States.

The organization is based in a 1897 City owned building formerly known as P.S. 160, and designed by the architect Charles B. J. Snyder in the collegiate neo-gothic style. It is a representative example of the large number of school buildings that were erected in New York City in the late nineteenth century. In the 1970s a fire caused the school to be vacated and it remained so until 1981, when Solidaridad Humana, a community based educational organization, began to use the building as a school for Spanish-speaking immigrants. Since 1993 the administration of The Clemente has been managing a growing program of long term studios for artists, available at a subsidized license fee.

The Clemente has developed an on-going performing arts and exhibition programming, and houses 4 theaters, 3 exhibition galleries, 46 subsidized artists studios, and 12 subsidized offices for arts and education non-for-profit organizations.

In December 2019, urban anthropologist, scholar, curator and cultural organizer/producer, Libertad O. Guerra, previously Director and Chief Curator of the Loisaida Cultural Center, was selected as Executive Director of the Clemente Soto Vélez Cultural and Educational Center.

Building: Charles B. J. Snyder 
The Clemente Soto Vélez Cultural and Educational Center is the foremost architectural landmark in that part of the Lower East Side still known as Loisaida. The Dutch Neo-Gothic building was designed as a public school by Charles B. J. Snyder.  He is widely recognized for his transformation of school building design and quality during his tenure as Superintendent of School Buildings of the New York City Board of Education between 1891 and 1923.

Snyder perceived school buildings as civic monuments that would better society and sought to provide spaces for learning that would offer a respite from noisy streets and poverty.  He was an inventive designer who at his best created school buildings that were appropriately imposing in their neighborhood settings, and that also, in both their massing and their ornamentation, showed a light-handedness that kept the structures from feeling oppressive.

He was concerned with health and safety issues in public schools and focused on fire protection, ventilation, lighting, and classroom size. Snyder used terra cotta blocks in floor construction to improve fireproofing, and large and numerous windows to allow more light and air into the classrooms.

The subject building, located on a corner lot, is L-shaped in configuration and five stories in height.  A dramatic steeply pitched roof line punctuated by dormers defines the street facades.

The building has a rich variety of ornamental details in terra cotta, limestone and brick. At the time the project commenced, many of the original wood windows remained while others had been replaced with less ornate wood or aluminum frames.  An iron fence surrounds the facility at the street facades and there are five entrance vestibules with wrought iron gates, bluestone steps and mosaic tile floors.

After over a century of service without substantial rehabilitation, the building was in very poor condition when Superstructures began an investigation of the exterior in 2006.  By that point there had been a sidewalk shed in place for eight years due to the deteriorated condition of the façade.  Interviews done as part of a master planning study conducted by The Clemente during this period confirmed a deep respect and admiration for the architecture of the building’s exterior. However, there was a vital interest in improving the safety of the building and in providing a more welcoming entrance.

The complete exterior restoration completed in 2012 under the direction of Superstructures Engineers + Architects included roof replacement and repair, replacement of bulkheads and copper gutters, replacement and/or repair of brick masonry, restoration or replacement of terra cotta, replacement and/or restoration of windows, cleaning of limestone and terrazzo. The NYC Department of Cultural Affairs and NYC Department of Citywide Administrative Services funded the project, which was managed by the NYC Department of Design and Construction. In 2013 the exterior restoration project was recognized by the New York Landmarks Conservancy with its prestigious Lucy G. Moses Preservation Award.

History: from PS 160 to Clemente Soto Vélez Cultural Center and Educational Center 
The building served as PS 160 until the mid-seventies. In 1984 it became the home of Solidaridad Humana, a community-based bilingual education program.

In 1993, Edgardo Vega Yunqué, Nelson Landrieu and Mateo Gómez, all of whom are actively involved in the Latinx arts community of New York City, founded the Clemente Soto Vélez as a cultural and educational center. At the time, Teatro La Tea, established by Landrieu and Gómez, was already based at 107 Suffolk Street.  Less than a year later, the trio acquired the lease to the building from Solidaridad Humana.

The Clemente Soto Vélez is a Puerto Rican/Latinx cultural institution that has demonstrated a broad-minded cultural vision and a collaborative philosophy.  Clemente Soto Vélez, a poet, journalist and activist, mentored many generations of Latinx artists in Puerto Rico and in New York City.  The organization’s mission is to foster, promote, and support the development of the arts within the community and to increase appreciation of Puerto Rican-Latinx arts in the city and beyond.

The Clemente currently provides studio space for over two dozen artists, as well as a home for the following institutions:
 Hispanic Organization for Latin Actors (HOLA), committed to exploring and expanding available avenues for projecting Hispanic artists into the mainstream.
 Afro Brazil Arts / Capoeira Angola Quintal, whose mission is to inspire achievement through capoeira, a Brazilian martial art that incorporates music and dancing.
 Fantastic Experimental Latino Theater (FELT), offering interactive theater and educational programs.
 Mark DeGarmo & Dancers/Dynamic Forms Inc, providing a comprehensive arts experience to students from economically disadvantaged circumstances.
The Society of the Educational Arts, Inc. (SEA), a bilingual arts-in-education organization & Latinx theatre company for young audiences.
 Teatro LaTea, one of New York’s premier Off-Off-Broadway Latinx theaters.

Exhibitions 
In 2022 an exhibition curated by Yasmeen Abdallah and Anna Shukeylo titled "To Have And To Hold" was presented. The show was inspired by memories of the Manhattan's Lower East Side neighborhood. Participating artists included Maria De Los Angeles and Julia Justo among others.

References

External links

Cultural centers in New York City
Lower East Side
Art museums and galleries in Manhattan
Hispanic and Latino American culture in New York City
Puerto Rican culture in New York City
1993 establishments in New York City